Laxmipur is a village and Gram panchayat in Narayanpet mandal of Narayanpet district, Telangana, India.

References

Villages in Narayanpet district